The 2005 Korean League Cup, also known as the 2005 Samsung Hauzen Cup, was the 18th competition of the Korean League Cup. It was a League Cup, but was run like a league format in this year. All teams played each other once, playing 12 matches each.

Table

Awards

Source:

See also
2005 in South Korean football
2005 K League
2005 Korean FA Cup

References

External links
Official website
RSSSF

2005
2005
Korean League Cup
Korean League Cup